The Eyilikler gudgeon (Gobio battalgilae) is a species of gudgeon, a small freshwater in the family Cyprinidae. It is found in Turkey.

Named in honor of Süleyman Balik, for his contributions to the knowledge of Turkish fishes.

References

 

Gobio
Taxa named by Alexander Mikhailovich Naseka
Taxa named by Füsun Erk'akan
Taxa named by Fahrettin Küçük
Fish described in 2006
Fish of Turkey